Savignia centrasiatica is a species of sheet weaver found in Russia. It was described by Eskov in 1991.

References

Linyphiidae
Spiders described in 1991
Spiders of Russia